Klub Sportowy Cuiavia Inowrocław is a football club from Inowrocław, Poland. It was founded in 1922. They're currently playing in IV liga (V level)

Cuiavia reached the second round of the 1989–90 Polish Cup, where the club lost to GKS Bełchatów.

References

External links
 Official website
 Cuiavia Inowrocław at the 90minut.pl  website (Polish)

 
Association football clubs established in 1922
1922 establishments in Poland
Inowrocław County